The Cabalian frog or Leyte slender stream frog (Hylarana albotuberculata) is a species of frog in the family Ranidae. It is endemic to the islands of Leyte, Samar, and Mindanao in the Philippines. It inhabits undisturbed and disturbed streams and rivers in lower montane and lowland forests. It is threatened by habitat loss through deforestation and habitat conversion to agriculture as well as by the pollution due to agricultural run-off.

References

Hylarana
Amphibians of the Philippines
Endemic fauna of the Philippines
Fauna of Leyte
Fauna of Samar
Fauna of Mindanao
Amphibians described in 1954
Taxonomy articles created by Polbot
Taxobox binomials not recognized by IUCN